General Arturo Puga Osorio (1879 – 28 April 1970) was a Chilean military officer and the chairman of the Government Junta in 1932.

On June 4, 1932, he became chairman of the Government Junta that was established after the resignation of President Juan Esteban Montero. His presidency lasted until June 16, 1932, when he was forced to resign by the army, who imposed Carlos Davila as the new president.

He married Bertha Martinez and had four children: Berta, Marta, Maria Helena, and Albertol Puga Martinez. Bertha married Alberto Lleras Camargo, the first secretary general of the Organization of American States.

See also
Socialist Republic of Chile

External links
Progressive Socialism. Time. (June 20, 1932).

1879 births
1970 deaths
Heads of state of Chile
Chilean Ministers of the Interior
Chilean Ministers of Defense
Chilean Army generals